Vadal Peterson (May 2, 1892 – September 1, 1976) was an American basketball coach with the distinction of coaching the most wins in University of Utah history. He guided Utah through 26 seasons from 1927 to 1953. He also led Utah to its only NCAA tournament title when the Utes defeated Dartmouth 42–40, in 1944. Peterson finished with a record of 385–230 (.626) while head coach of Utah and collected four Mountain States Conference championships and the 1947 National Invitation Tournament title.

Head coaching record

Basketball

See also
 List of NCAA Division I Men's Final Four appearances by coach

References

1892 births
1976 deaths
American men's basketball players
Utah Utes men's basketball coaches
Utah Utes men's basketball players
Utah Utes baseball coaches
College men's basketball head coaches in the United States